William Henry Porter (5 March 1790 – 27 April 1861) was President of the Royal College of Surgeons in Ireland (RCSI) in 1838.

William Henry Ported graduated in Arts from Trinity College Dublin in 1810. In January, 1809, he was indentured to Sir Philip Crampton  and his studies continued in the RCSI medical school and in the Meath Hospital. On 13 September 1814, he obtained the Letters Testimonial of the College, and on 10 November 1817, was elected a Member. In 1826 he became connected, as a teacher of anatomy and surgery, with the Park-street School of Medicine, and in 1837 he was elected Professor of Surgery to the Royal College of Surgeons in Ireland.

He was Surgeon to the Meath Hospital and Consulting Surgeon to the City of Dublin Hospital. Porter published Observations on the surgical pathology of the larynx and trachea (Dublin, Hodges and McArthur, 1826). which, also published in London and Edinburgh, ran to three editions.

See also
 List of presidents of the Royal College of Surgeons in Ireland

References 

Presidents of the Royal College of Surgeons in Ireland
Irish surgeons
1790 births
1861 deaths